William Sowerby may refer to:
 William Sowerby (clergyman)
 William Sowerby (politician)